The Ford Super Duty engine is a range of V8 engines that were manufactured by Ford Motor Company.  Introduced in 1958, the Super Duty engines replaced the Lincoln Y-block V8 (alongside the smaller Ford MEL V8 engines). 

By the end of the 1970s, the use of the Super Duty engine began to decline in heavy trucks in favor of diesel-fueled engines; in medium-duty trucks, variants of the similar-displacement (but higher-efficiency) 385-series V8s became more commonly used. In 1981, Ford withdrew the Super Duty engine line.

Through its production, the Super Duty engines were assembled by Ford in its Cleveland Engine Plant #2 in Brook Park, Ohio.

Design
The Super Duty engine is 90-degree overhead-valve V8 with angled piston decks. The cylinder heads are flat and the pistons are crowned to create a wedge-shaped combustion chamber within the cylinder bore; the compression ratio is 7.5:1 for all models. They are typically governed to 3400 rpm.

The early Super Duty has a unique intake system where the intake plenum is connected directly to the cylinder head; all four cylinders pull the air/fuel mixture from a single "log" type port in the head. The engines could "spit" when cold and blow the choke plate out into the air cleaner because of the large port configuration. In later engines this was corrected with a conventional spider-type intake. The exhaust valves are filled with sodium to carry heat from the valve head to the valve spring, which would dissipate it into the oil coming off the rocker arm. (It is more likely that the sodium in the valve stems in these engines carried the heat to the coolant in the cylinder head, not to the valve springs.)

A marine version of the 534, the "Seamaster", was available from the Seamaster Marine Engine Co. starting in the late 1950s.

Applications 
The heaviest and highest-displacement V8 engines ever built by Ford, the Super Duty engines were never used in automobiles; its debut in medium and heavy trucks marked the renaming of Ford F-Series "Big Job" conventionals after the engine. Slotted above the 330, 361, and 391 FT V8s used in the medium-duty F-Series (F-500 to F-700 and B-series), the Super Duty was used in heavy-duty trucks, including the F-800, F-900 "Super Duty" conventionals.

Outside of the F-Series, the Super Duty engine was used in several model ranges of Ford heavy trucks, including:

 Ford C-Series low-cab COE
 Ford N-Series short-hood Class 8 conventional (replacement for F-Series conventional)
 Ford H-Series (Class 8 COE; "Two Story Falcon" variant of C-Series)
 Ford L-Series (Class 7-8 conventional)

See also
 List of Ford engines

References

External links
H-Series Ford Trucks

S
V8 engines
Gasoline engines by model